Central Time may refer to:
Central Time Zone, a time zone in North America
Central European Time, a time zone in Europe
Australian Central Time, a time zone in Australia (see Time in Australia)